Branton is a village in South Yorkshire, England. At the 2011 census, it had a population of 1,992.

History
Branton is mentioned in the Domesday Book as belonging to Geoffrey Alselin as having 15 ploughlands, and a church. The name Branton derives from the Old English Brōm-tūn; the farmstead/town where the broom grew (or town among the broom). The village was formerly in the wapentake of Strafforth and Tickhill. In 1951, a farmer ploughing fields at Kilham Farm to the north east of the village, discovered fragments of pottery. The site has since been surveyed and documented as Romano-British pottery location which had several kilns, using the nearby River Torne for transport pottery away from Branton.

There is a primary school in the village, named St Wilfrid's, which was rated as Good by Ofsted in 2019. There is a post office, grocer, newsagent, butcher and pub in the village. There used to be a chapel and a church but these have been demolished. The pub is called the Three Horseshoes, and was renovated in 1907. A frequent bus service connects the village with Cantley and Doncaster.

The Yorkshire Wildlife Park is immediately to the south of the village; it is bounded to the east by the River Torne, and to the west by the M18 motorway, which separates it from Cantley.

Governance 
Branton is in the parliamentary constituency of Don Valley, and in the civil parish of Cantley with Branton.

References

External links

Villages in South Yorkshire